Ram Buxani (born 1941) is a Dubai-based Non-Resident Indian entrepreneur and chairman of the business conglomerate ITL Cosmos Group. He became a well-known figure in the Indian community after his role in influencing the Indian government to abolish estate duty in 1985.

Career
Buxani was Director of IndusInd Bank for 8 years (during 2000 to 2008). During 2009-2004, he was Chairman of the Board of The Indian High School, Dubai.

Buxani was the founder and Chairman (during 1987-1993 and 1995-1999 ) of the Overseas Indians Economic Forum (UAE), which was a preeminent forum for the Indian NRI community until 2003 when it merged with the Indian Business and Professional Council.
He was also instrumental in supporting and arranging temporary shelter for the NRIs fleeing from Kuwait en route to India during the Invasion of Kuwait by Iraq in 1990.

Sripriyaa Kumaria, Director General of the India Trade & Exhibition Centre in Sharjah, described him as "the founding father of the U.A.E.’s NRI community".

Forbes Middle East selected him as one of the top Indian leaders of Middle East during 2014, 2016 and 2017 and awarded him a "Lifetime Achievement Award" in 2017.

Education
In 2004, he obtained a Ph.D. degree in International Business from Washington International University, an online unaccredited institution. He has an honorary D.Litt. Degree by D.Y. Patil University of Mumbai for his contribution for NRIs and victims of natural calamity.

Personal life
Buxani was born in 1941 in Hyderabad, Sindh in British India. Like many other Sindhi families, his family migrated to India after the Partition of India in 1947. His father passed away when he was five years old.

At the age of 18 years, in order to support his widowed mother and family, he started to search for a job in Mumbai. After seeing an advertisement on a local newspaper, he applied for a job as an executive assistant with International Traders Limited in Dubai. After securing the job, in November 1959, he boarded a steamship to Dubai that finally anchored off the coast of Dubai on a rainy day and he was ferried ashore in a small boat to the beach. This was during an era when Dubai was part of the Trucial States and was not even marked on most maps. Buxani started working in 1959 as an office clerk at the ITL outpost at Dubai and eventually rose to chair the Cosmos ITL group in 2014.

Buxani is also a writer and actor, having acted in 28 plays. He has three daughters and seven grandchildren.

His autobiography “Taking the High Road” was a bestseller in Dubai for several months when it was published in 2003. Subsequently, it was translated to Arabic, Hindi, Malayalam, and several Indian and Pakistani languages.
Another book titled "Sindhis – God’s Gift to Global Economy" was published in 2007.

References

External links
 Official website

1949 births
Indian business executives
Businesspeople from Dubai
Living people